Flavored milk is a sweetened dairy drink made with milk, sugar, flavorings, and sometimes food colorings. It may be sold as a pasteurized, refrigerated product, or as an ultra-high-temperature (UHT) treated product not requiring refrigeration. It may also be made in restaurants or homes by mixing flavorings into milk.

In New England, milk blended with flavored syrups such as chocolate or strawberry in a milkshake machine, is commonly called a "milkshake"; in other parts of the United States, a milkshake always includes ice cream or thickeners.

Types

Bottled spiced (masala) milk is a popular beverage in the Indian subcontinent. Other companies provide flavored beverages in the United Kingdom, which sells packaged beverages to the mobile vendor market. Over the years, Kemps, a Midwestern milk company, has put various flavors of milk on the market, including their "Monkey Business" milk which is banana flavored.

Flavored milk is particularly popular in the Australian states of South Australia and Western Australia. Similarly, a 2006 Adelaide Advertiser reported South Australia consumed  of flavored milk each year, with 82% of market share held by a single brand, Farmers Union. According to Coca-Cola Amatil, one of the largest bottlers in the Asia-Pacific region, South Australia is the only place where sales of flavored milk outstrip those of cola.

Controversy and criticism

Jamie Oliver, host of Jamie Oliver's Food Revolution, brought attention in the United States to public schools that serve flavored milk in the school cafeterias.  Flavored milk advocates claim that many children will avoid the nutrition found in milk unless it has been flavored, with the benefits of milk outweighing a few teaspoons of sugar. Opponents say that with rising levels of obesity and heart disease, flavored milk should be removed from schools and children should be taught to drink plain milk.

A 2018 analysis of more than 90 popular chilled flavored dairy milks revealed that a carton of flavored milk can contain as much sugar as a can of soft drink, with many of the bestselling brands containing more than a day’s worth of added sugar in a single serving.

See also
 Chocolate milk
 Coffee milk
 Horlicks
 Malted milk
 Milkshake
 Nesquik

References

External links

National Dairy Council-Flavored Milk